The 1931 Wimbledon Championships took place on the outdoor grass courts at the All England Lawn Tennis and Croquet Club in Wimbledon, London, United Kingdom. The tournament was held from Monday 22 June until Saturday 4 July 1931. It was the 51st staging of the Wimbledon Championships, and the third Grand Slam tennis event of 1931. Sidney Wood and Cilly Aussem won the singles titles.

Finals

Men's singles

 Sidney Wood defeated  Frank Shields, walkover

Women's singles

 Cilly Aussem defeated  Hilde Krahwinkel, 6–2, 7–5

Men's doubles

 George Lott /  John Van Ryn defeated  Jacques Brugnon /  Henri Cochet, 6–2, 10–8, 9–11, 3–6, 6–3

Women's doubles

 Dorothy Shepherd-Barron /  Phyllis Mudford defeated  Doris Metaxa /  Josane Sigart, 3–6, 6–3, 6–4

Mixed doubles

 George Lott /  Anna Harper defeated  Ian Collins /  Joan Ridley, 6–3, 1–6, 6–1

References

External links
 Official Wimbledon Championships website

 
Wimbledon Championships
Wimbledon Championships
Wimbledon Championships
Wimbledon Championships